Oryza brachyantha is a grass in the rice genus Oryza, distantly related to cultivated rice O. sativa, and native to tropical Africa. It is an annual grass that grows as a tuft.

The genome of O. brachyantha has been sequenced.

References

brachyantha
Grasses of Africa
Flora of Northeast Tropical Africa
Flora of West Tropical Africa
Flora of West-Central Tropical Africa
Flora of Zambia
Taxa named by Auguste Chevalier